Jimmy Connors was the defending champion of the singles event at the ABN World Tennis Tournament, but did not participate in this edition. First-seeded Björn Borg won the title after a victory in the final against third-seeded John McEnroe 6–4, 6–2.

Seeds

Draw

Finals

Upper half

Lower half

References

External links
 ITF tournament edition details

1979 ABN World Tennis Tournament